Sludka is a rural locality (a selo) and the administrative center of Sludovskoye Rural Settlement, Chernushinsky District, Perm Krai, Russia. The population was 572 as of 2010. There are 10 streets.

Geography 
Sludka is located 10 km southwest of Chernushka (the district's administrative centre) by road. Verkh-Kiga is the nearest rural locality.

References 

Rural localities in Chernushinsky District